Harold Fox (born August 29, 1949) is a former professional basketball player who played in the National Basketball Association (NBA) for the Buffalo Braves.

As a high school player at Northwestern High School in Hyattsville, Prince George's County, Maryland, Fox was one of the best high school players to ever come out of the Washington metro area. As a junior guard, he helped lead the Wildcats to a Maryland State Championship with Captain Mark Christian, a dominant center. As a senior guard, Fox was a First Team All-Metropolitan selection and despite the graduation of Christian, led Northwestern to a second-in-a-row Maryland State Basketball Championship his senior season. He was also named the 1968 High School Player of the Year in the Washington Metro Area. Later he suffered a serious finger injury on his right hand, that required surgery, when a classroom door closed on it but was able to make full recovery. Northwestern Coach Bill Longsworth was killed during the summer of 1969 when his motorcycle was hit by a truck. Northwestern won no more championships until the Len Bias era.

In his freshman year of college, Fox played for Brevard Community College (now Eastern Florida State College) where he averaged 27.7 points per game in 29 appearances and was a NJCAA Third Team All-American. After his sophomore year, Fox transferred to Jacksonville University. In his two seasons at Jacksonville, Fox averaged 19.9 points per game and 6.5 assists per game.  Fox was drafted with the third pick in the second round of the 1972 NBA Draft. He played in 10 games for the Buffalo Braves in the 1972–73 NBA season and averaged 3.1 points per game, 1.0 assists per game and 0.8 rebounds per game.

References

External links
 

1949 births
Living people
American men's basketball players
Basketball players from Maryland
Buffalo Braves draft picks
Buffalo Braves players
Guards (basketball)
Jacksonville Dolphins men's basketball players
Junior college men's basketball players in the United States
People from Hyattsville, Maryland
Sportspeople from the Washington metropolitan area